Vermont elected its members On September 1, 1818.

See also 
 1818 and 1819 United States House of Representatives elections
 List of United States representatives from Vermont

Notes

References 

1818
Vermont
United States House of Representatives